This is a survey of the postage stamps and postal history of Guinea-Bissau, formerly known as Portuguese Guinea.

Guinea-Bissau is located in West Africa. It is bordered by Senegal to the north, and Guinea to the south and east, with the Atlantic Ocean to its west.

Portuguese Guinea

Stamps of Cape Verde were used in what is now Guinea-Bissau from 1877. The first stamps of Portuguese Guinea were issued 1881, overprinting stamps of Cape Verde. The first series of definitives was issued in 1886.

In 1913, the Vasco da Gama commemorative series of Macau, Timor and Portuguese Africa were surcharged in new currency for Portuguese Guinea. The Ceres series was issued in Portuguese Guinea from 1914.

Independence
The first stamps of independent Guinea-Bissau were issued in 1974.

Further reading
 Correl, Frank. "Inside Guinea-Bissau." The American Philatelist. Vol. 111 No. 4 (April 1997), p. 322-328.
 Figueiredo, J Pîres de. "Os selos postais da Guiné Portuguesa." Boletim cultural da Guiné Portuguesa. Nos. 11/15/16. (Julho 1948/Julho 1949/Outubro 1949).
 Küchler, Reinhard. Republik Guinea-Bissau seit der Unabhängigkeit 1974 : Philatelie und Postgeschichte. Düsseldorf: Briefmarkenfreunde-Düsseldorf, 2009
 Oliveira Pinto, Fernando de. Os selos Coroa da Guine: "Guine" pequena-os primeiros selos. Madrid: Fundacao Albertino de Figueiredo para a Filatelia (FFA), 2003 , 180p.

References 

Communications in Guinea-Bissau
Guinea-Bissau